FJCA may refer to:

Fiji Court of Appeal
Joint Combat Aircraft